Nepenthes negros is a tropical pitcher plant native to the Philippines, specifically the islands of Biliran and Negros.

Nepenthes negros belongs to the informal "N. alata group", which also includes N. alata, N. ceciliae, N. copelandii, N. extincta, N. graciliflora, N. hamiguitanensis, N. kitanglad, N. kurata, N. leyte, N. mindanaoensis, N. ramos, N. saranganiensis, and N. ultra. These species are united by a number of morphological characters, including winged petioles, lids with basal ridges on the lower surface (often elaborated into appendages), and upper pitchers that are usually broadest near the base.

It has been suggested that N. negros might fall within the natural variability of N. ramos, though field studies would be needed to confirm this.

References

 Mey, F.S. (2013). The Nepenthes alata group: resurrection of N. graciliflora ; N. ramos and N. negros described as new species. Strange Fruits: A Garden's Chronicle, August 27, 2013.
 Smith, L. (2014). Pitcher perfect - but carnivorous plants are at risk. The Independent, January 5, 2014. 

Carnivorous plants of Asia
negros
Plants described in 2013
Taxa named by Martin Cheek
Taxa named by Matthew Jebb